The Pied Cow Coffeehouse, or simply the Pied Cow, is a coffeehouse and hookah lounge in Portland, Oregon's Sunnyside neighborhood, in the United States. The restaurant has an "eclectic" interior decor and,  in addition to coffee drinks and hookah, serves fondue, desserts, mezze platters, and wine. It is known for being reportedly haunted by a woman named Lydia and has received generally positive reviews. The Pied Cow appears in Robyn Miller's 2013 film The Immortal Augustus Gladstone, which also featured a cameo appearance by restaurant owner Jimmy Chen, and on the artwork for Kyle Craft's 2018 album Full Circle Nightmare.

Description

The Pied Cow is a coffeehouse and hookah lounge along Belmont Street, housed in a reportedly haunted Victorian house in southeast Portland's Sunnyside neighborhood. The menu includes coffee-based drinks, cheese fondue, mezze platters, hummus, desserts, beer, wine, tea, and hookah. Menus display quotes by Friedrich Nietzsche. The interior is "eclectically decorated" and has a "cluttered altar dedicated to everyone from Nick Cave to Buddha". Dylan Jefferies and Delaney White of the Daily Vanguard called the Pied Cow "whimsical", writing that "numerous Victorian paintings and eclectic items adorn the walls, and a staircase is built up like a kind of altar, with various flowers, silks and dolls ornamenting every step".

According to Thrillist, the restaurant's patio is covered during winter months and the lawn is used during the summer months. The exterior has tall hedges and trees, as well as benches, plastic chairs, and "mismatched" lawn furniture. The large white tent used for outdoor dining is illuminated by heat lamps and Christmas lights. In 2014, a writer for The Columbian said the Pied Cow has a "varied clientele". In 2012, Willamette Week John Locanthi said the establishment did not serve people under the age of 21. In contrast, in 2019 the paper said, "Anyone who grew up in Portland, especially in Southeast, knows the Pied Cow as a place to go to before turning 21."

History
Before the Pied Cow, the house was occupied by a "lively" restaurant called Buttertoes. The restaurant was opened by three sisters in 1979 and continued operating into the early 1990s. The walls had murals of fairies and mermaids. In 1996, Jennifer "Jenny" Joyce painted Keep on the Sunnyside, a ten-panel mural celebrating the "history and character" of the neighborhood, along SE 30th Avenue at Belmont. One of the panels depicts the house and the Thaddeus Fisher House. Faded over time by multiple cleanings and neglect, the mural was repainted by the Portland Street Art Alliance, which supports muralists and other street artists, with Joyce's permission in 2018.

Robyn Miller's 2013 mockumentary film The Immortal Augustus Gladstone about a "150-year-old epileptic vampire with gay tendencies" was set in Portland and filed in part at the Pied Cow. The restaurant's owner, Jimmy Chen, made a cameo appearance. Described as "strangely poetic" by The Washington Post, the film won Best Picture at the Oregon Independent Film Festival. The photograph used as artwork for Kyle Craft's 2018 album Full Circle Nightmare was taken at the Pied Cow. Additionally, the restaurant served as a set for the music video to Craft's song "Heartbreak Junky".

Reported haunting

The building, which has housed Buttertoes and the Pied Cow, is reportedly haunted by a "kind and gentle" woman named Lydia, who "made items fall off shelves in the kitchen on a regular basis". In 2017, The Oregonian Grant Butler said the house "looks like the perfect setting for a ghost story" and wrote, "What gained [Buttertoes] notoriety was its reputation for being haunted by a ghost named Aunt Lydia." Jefferies and White described the apparition in more detail: 

The owners of Buttertoes hired a psychic who determined there was "a spirit was present in the home". A waitress reportedly resigned from the restaurant "after feeling so uncomfortable while closing by herself", according to Jefferies and White. In 2009, a server who had worked for Pied Cow for three years described a sink where she had felt "creeped out", saying, "I've semi-frequently had the feeling of seeing someone come down the stairs and go into the office." In 2013, employee Zachary Schauer recalled seeing Lydia after a long shift and said, "I just didn't give a shit and went upstairs. Several different people have seen her, and nothing really crazy has happened. It's a pretty typical young Catholic girl in a white dress kind of deal."

In a 2009 overview of Portland's reportedly haunted sites, Chen "declined to comment on the restaurant's alleged haunting. But in the kitchen, the wait staff buzzes with talk of the creepy basement." Jefferies and White said the Pied Cow "certainly plays up the haunted vibe" and wrote in 2019, "Many believe that the Ghost of Aunt Lydia still haunts the quirky Victorian house, and patrons of the Pied Cow still keep an eye out for her while sipping mint tea and smoking ornate hookahs."

Reception

In 2009, the Portland Mercury described the Pied Cow as a "pie shop/hookah bar/dispensary of all-around-delicious eats". Portland Monthly has said, "If you're looking for an unusual coffee house experience, this place is it. Walking into the Pied Cow is like stepping into your great-grandmother's parlor, complete with 19th century furniture and an array of wall art. Adding to the quirk, there's hookah on the patio and solid marionberry pie." In his 2012 book, Peaceful Places Portland, Paul Gerald wrote: 

In his 2012 guide to local hookah establishments, John Locanthi of Willamette Week said the Pied Cow was dog-friendly and had "a more limited selection of flavors, mostly offering single fruit flavors". Furthermore, he opined, "The tranquil courtyard is the perfect spot to take a date. Mellow music, elegant wooden benches and delicious snacks are the perfect accompaniments to a warm summer evening." Jennifer Gilroy recommended the Pied Cow for hookah in her 2015 overview of smoking options in Portland. In her article on the "best secret nooks and hidey-holes in Portland cafes", the newspaper's Shannon Gormley called the restaurant "a goth's approximation of an Old World cafe" and wrote in 2017, "Since the Pied Cow doubles as a late-night hookah bar, it's rarely crowded during regular coffee-shop hours, which makes the tiny tables pushed up against large windows perfect loner havens... [T]he tent houses a few tables, but during off hours, you're most likely to have it all to yourself." In 2018, Lauren Yoshiko recommend the pecan pie "on the back patio (hookah optional), where there is often a very friendly neighborhood cat awaiting your attention".

A writer for The Columbian found the wait staff friendly and opined in 2014, "On a warm summer evening, the ample outdoor seating of Pied Cow under light-strung trees is just chill." Thrillist called the Pied Cow "a Portland classic" and said the exterior landscaping will make you "feel like you're dining in your own private garden". Zagat gives the Pied Cow ratings of 4.6 for food, 4.5 for decor, and 4.0 for service, each on a scale of 5. The guide said, "Beautiful meets bohemian at this Sunnyside coffeehouse set in a grand Victorian, where regulars fall in love with the exquisite desserts and other sweet and savory nosh plates; the romantic patio doubles as a hookah garden, and while it can get crowded, it's still a date-worthy choice, especially on summer nights."

See also

 List of reportedly haunted locations in the United States

References

External links

 J. C. Havely House, 1893, at the Portland Street Art Alliance
 
 The Pied Cow Coffeehouse at Zomato

Coffeehouses and cafés in Oregon
Coffee in Portland, Oregon
Reportedly haunted locations in Portland, Oregon
Restaurants in Portland, Oregon
Sunnyside, Portland, Oregon